is a headland at the easternmost point of the Japanese island of Shikoku, in the city of Anan, Tokushima Prefecture. The promontory extends into the Kii Channel and is situated within Muroto-Anan Kaigan Quasi-National Park. The sandy beach to the north is an egg-laying ground for loggerhead sea turtles and has been designated a Prefectural Natural Monument. In late autumn and winter, so-called "Daruma Sunrises" sometime occur, with the sun appearing in the shape of the Greek letter omega Ω.

See also

 List of Places of Scenic Beauty of Japan (Tokushima)
 List of Natural Monuments of Japan (Tokushima)
 Cape Ashizuri
 Cape Sada

References

Anan, Tokushima
Landforms of Tokushima Prefecture
Kamoda
Extreme points of Japan